Måneskin is an Italian rock band formed in Rome in 2016. The band is composed of vocalist Damiano David, bassist Victoria De Angelis, guitarist Thomas Raggi, and drummer Ethan Torchio. Performing in the streets in its early days, it rose to prominence after finishing second in the eleventh season of the Italian version of X Factor in 2017.

The band has released three studio albums, Il ballo della vita (2018), Teatro d'ira: Vol. I (2021) and Rush! (2023). It has released one extended play, Chosen (2017), and 13 singles, which have topped Italian and European music charts. It has reveived 34 platinum and 7 gold certifications from FIMI, and had sold over one million records in Italy before their post-Eurovision breakthrough. Previously, the band's most successful Italian single was "Torna a casa". In 2021, Måneskin became the first Italian rock band to reach the top 10 on the UK Singles Chart, with the songs "Zitti e buoni", "I Wanna Be Your Slave" and a cover of The Four Seasons' "Beggin'" reaching the top 10 on the Billboard Global Excl. U.S. chart, receiving multiple international certifications for sales of over 3 million copies internationally, and 4 million in total. It received its first Grammy nomination in the Best New Artist category at the 2023 Grammy Awards.

 Måneskin has sold an estimated 40 million copies worldwide and garnered 4 billion streams across all streaming platforms, and 6 diamond, 133 platinum, and 34 gold certifications.

History

2015–2016: Formation 

Members Damiano David, Victoria De Angelis, and Thomas Raggi first met each other as students during their high school days in Rome, with Ethan Torchio from nearby Frosinone soon joining them when they inquired on Facebook in a "Musicians Wanted" advert for a drummer to complete the line-up. Although the band's origins can be traced to 2015, it was officially formed in 2016 when the members had to choose the band's name because they had decided to register for Pulse, a local music contest for emerging bands.
The Pulse contest also marked a turning point in their career, since they had to start writing their own songs. The competition led them to perform at the Felt music club & school in front of 200–300 people, and they later went on to win first prize.

They later performed as buskers in the streets of the Colli Portuensi district of Rome, as well as in the historical centre of Rome, including in Via del Corso. One of their first live concerts outside their native city took place in Faenza, at the 2016 Meeting of Independent Record Labels. Approximately 30 people attended the show. After a trip to Denmark, during which the band also performed some live shows, Måneskin strengthened their cohesiveness, and started to play together for several hours a day.

2017–2019: X Factor and Il ballo della vita 

In 2017, they took part in the eleventh season of the Italian talent show X Factor, under the guidance of mentor Manuel Agnelli, finishing in second place behind Lorenzo Licitra. There they covered "Beggin'" by the Four Seasons, "Take Me Out" by Franz Ferdinand, and "Somebody Told Me" by the Killers, among others. The original song they performed during the show, "Chosen", was released as a single on 24 November 2017 by Sony Music and charted at number two on the Italian FIMI Singles Chart. It was included in the extended play of the same title, released in mid-December 2017 and mainly consisting of covers previously performed during the X Factor live shows. The EP was later certified double platinum by FIMI.

On 23 March 2018, the band released their first Italian-language single, "Morirò da re", which continued their commercial success. Måneskin's first full-length studio album, featuring "Morirò da re" and preceded by the ballad single "Torna a casa", was released on 26 October 2018. Both the album, titled Il ballo della vita, and the single "Torna a casa" topped the charts in Italy.
To promote the album, the band theatrically released a documentary film, titled This Is Måneskin. The film premiered in Italy on 26 October 2018.

In January 2019, the band released their fourth single "Fear for Nobody", while in April 2019 their fifth single "L'altra dimensione" rose to fourth on the FIMI Singles Chart. Their sixth single "Le parole lontane", which was released in September 2019, reached top 5 of the FIMI Singles Chart and was certified platinum. During their first tour, held between 2018 and 2019, they sold-out over 70 dates along with selling more than 140,000 tickets, a figure that also included their first European tour with eleven sold-out dates in Spain, France, Switzerland, Germany, Belgium and the United Kingdom.

2020–2021: Teatro d'ira Vol. I, Eurovision and global recognition 
From late 2019 until spring 2020, the band lived in London where they worked on their music style and new material. In October 2020, their seventh single "Vent'anni" was released. On 6 March 2021, the band won the Sanremo Music Festival 2021 with the song "Zitti e buoni", ahead of runners-up Francesca Michielin and Fedez, and Ermal Meta. Their win was viewed by many to be a surprise, as rock is considered an atypical contesting music genre in the history of the Festival. Prior to Sanremo, the band announced their second studio album Teatro d'ira Vol. I, which was released on 19 March 2021.

As the winners of Sanremo 2021, Måneskin were designated as the Italian representatives at the Eurovision Song Contest 2021, held in Rotterdam, Netherlands, with "Zitti e buoni". On 15 May, Italy climbed to the top of the betting odds to win the contest, surpassing competitors from France, Switzerland and Malta, all of whom had occupied the top spot at one point between the release date of their songs and the night of the grand final. On 22 May, the band confirmed the predictions by going on to win the contest with an energetic performance, having received a total of 524 points, thus giving Italy its third Eurovision triumph after Gigliola Cinquetti in 1964 and Toto Cutugno in 1990. Måneskin also became the first band and "Zitti e buoni" the first rock song to win the contest since Lordi with "Hard Rock Hallelujah" for Finland in 2006. Upon accepting the winner's trophy, Damiano shouted into the microphone:
 

After the contest, the album Teatro d'ira Vol. I, its single "Zitti e buoni", tracks "I Wanna Be Your Slave" and "Coraline", as well as other releases from the band entered weekly charts across Europe and beyond, including several Spotify global charts. "Zitti e buoni" and "I Wanna Be Your Slave" also entered the top ten of the Billboard Global Excl. U.S. chart. "Zitti e buoni" also became the first Italian-language song in 30 years to chart on the top 20 of the UK Singles Chart, peaking at number 17, as well as "I Wanna Be Your Slave" peaking at number five, which was the first song by an Italian rock band to reach the UK top ten, thus making the band the first Eurovision winners since Celine Dion to have two songs in the UK top 40, and a top 10 hit with a non-contest song. Their 2017 cover of "Beggin'" also peaked at number six, thus making them the first Italian act and the first Eurovision-associated act to have two songs charting in the top ten of the UK Singles Chart at the same time. "Beggin'" later debuted on the US Billboard Hot 100 chart at number 78 and went on to peak at number 13, making them the second Eurovision-winning act in recent history to break into the chart. "I Wanna Be Your Slave" and "Beggin'" were subsequently certified platinum by the BPI, with the former also certified gold and the latter platinum by the RIAA.

The band went on a European promotional tour between June and July, and performed at a number of open-air summer music festivals in 2021, including Rock for People and Nova Rock Festival.  A live recording of "Beggin'", recorded at Ronquières Festival 2021, was released as a digital single on 27 September 2021. The band's tenth single "Mammamia" was released on 8 October. On 26 October, they made their US television debut performing "Beggin'" on The Tonight Show Starring Jimmy Fallon, and later in November performed on The Ellen DeGeneres Show, the MTV Europe Music Awards where they won the award for Best Rock act, and at the American Music Awards. During this period, they also held a sold-out London concert at the O2 Academy Islington, sold-out US concerts at the Roxy Theatre and Bowery Ballroom, and opened for the Rolling Stones at Las Vegas' Allegiant Stadium.

2022–present: Rush! 

On 22 January 2022, Måneskin were the musical guest on Saturday Night Live. The band's eleventh single "Supermodel" was released on 13 May, and was performed at the final of the Eurovision Song Contest 2022, held in Turin the following day. They also performed a short rendition of "If I Can Dream" which was later included in the soundtrack of the film Elvis. "Supermodel" was additionally performed on The Tonight Show Starring Jimmy Fallon on 20 May, and at the 2022 MTV Video Music Awards (where the band won the Best Alternative category for "I Wanna Be Your Slave") on 28 August. Måneskin embarked on the Loud Kids Tour Gets Louder, which visited Japan, the Americas, and Europe between fall 2022 and summer 2023.

Their twelfth single "The Loneliest" was released on 7 October. The band's third studio album, Rush!, was released on 20 January 2023. They were nominated for the Best New Artist category for the upcoming 65th Annual Grammy Awards. "La fine" was released as a promotional single from Rush! on 16 December. On 13 January 2023, the band released the single and music video for "Gossip", featuring Tom Morello. In February 2023, Variety ran a profile piece on Måneskin, referring to them as "the biggest rock band to emerge in years". In June 2023, the band will make their debut at the Glastonbury Festival, followed by the Rush! World Tour, which will visit Europe, North America, South America and Asia from September to December 2023.

Musical style and influences 

According to Damiano David, the group is "a translation of the music of the past into modernity". Måneskin's music has been classified as pop rock, alternative rock, glam rock and hard rock. Their music style changed from a pop rock sound with funk influences on their first studio album, to hard rock on their second studio album, as heard in "Zitti e buoni". Their look and sound have been compared to 1970s rock music. The band members have cited various musical and fashion influences, including Led Zeppelin, Fleetwood Mac, Nirvana, Perry Farrell, Radiohead, Franz Ferdinand, David Bowie, Aerosmith, Black Sabbath, Gentle Giant, the Rolling Stones, the Doors, Arctic Monkeys, Red Hot Chili Peppers, Harry Styles, Bruno Mars, R.E.M. and Italian rock bands Marlene Kuntz, Verdena and Afterhours.

Band members 

 Damiano David – vocals
 Victoria De Angelis – bass
 Thomas Raggi – guitar
 Ethan Torchio – drums

Discography 

 Il ballo della vita (2018)
 Teatro d'ira: Vol. I (2021)
 Rush! (2023)

Filmography

Tours 
 Il ballo della vita Tour (2018–2019)
 Loud Kids Tour Gets Louder (2022–2023)
 Rush! World Tour (2023)

Awards and nominations

Notes

References

External links 

 

|-

|-

2016 establishments in Italy
Eurovision Song Contest entrants for Italy
Eurovision Song Contest entrants of 2021
Eurovision Song Contest winners
Pop rock groups
Italian alternative rock groups
MTV Europe Music Award winners
Musical groups established in 2016
Musical groups from Rome
Musical quartets
Sanremo Music Festival winners
X Factor (Italian TV series) contestants
English-language singers from Italy